Gadom  is a village in the administrative district of Gmina Golczewo, within Kamień County, West Pomeranian Voivodeship, in north-western Poland.

The village has an approximate population of 150.

References

Gadom